David A. Satter (born August 1, 1947) is an American journalist and historian who writes about Russia and the Soviet Union. He has authored books and articles about the decline and fall of the Soviet Union and the rise of post-Soviet Russia. Satter was expelled from Russia by the government in 2013. He is perhaps best known as the first researcher who claimed that Vladimir Putin and Russia's Federal Security Service were behind the 1999 Russian apartment bombings and is particularly critical of Putin's rise to the Russian presidency.

Life and career
Satter was born in Chicago, the son of Clarice Komsky, a homemaker, and Mark Satter, a well-regarded attorney and civil rights activist. He graduated from the University of Chicago and from the University of Oxford where he was a Rhodes Scholar.

From 1976 to 1982, he was the Moscow correspondent of the Financial Times of London. He then became a special correspondent on Soviet affairs of The Wall Street Journal. He is currently a senior fellow at the Hudson Institute and a fellow of the Johns Hopkins University School of Advanced International Studies. He has been a research fellow at the Hoover Institution at Stanford University and a visiting professor at the University of Illinois at Urbana-Champaign.

His partner is Nadezhda Kutepova, a human rights lawyer and Russian political refugee in France. See, City 40.

Post-Soviet Russia
In the 1990s, Satter wrote extensively about post-Soviet Russia. In an article in The Wall Street Journal Europe, April 2, 1997, he wrote: "When the Soviet Union fell… the moral impulse motivating the democratic movement had to become the basis of Russia’s political practices. The tragedy of the present situation is that Russian gangsters are cutting off this development before it has a chance to take root."

Reviews
Jack Matlock, the former U.S. ambassador in Moscow, writing in The Washington Post, said that Age of Delirium was "spellbinding" and gave "a visceral sense of what it felt like to be trapped in the communist system." The Virginia Quarterly Review wrote, "The brilliance of this book lies in its eccentricity and in the author’s profound knowledge of and sympathy for the suffering of the Russian people under communism."

Martin Sieff, writing in the Canadian National Post, wrote that Darkness at Dawn was "Vivid, impeccably researched and truly frightening." Angus Macqueen, writing in The Guardian, compared Darkness at Dawn to Putin’s Russia by Anna Politkovskaya. Sieff wrote: "Both of these books underline the moral vacuum that the destruction of the Soviet Union has left."

1999 Russian apartment bombings
In his book, Darkness at Dawn, Satter charged that the Russian Federal Security Service (FSB) was responsible for the bombings of Russian apartment buildings in 1999 that claimed nearly 300 lives and provided the justification for a second Chechen War. He argued that this was part of a conspiracy to bring Putin to power as Boris Yeltsin was fading. During testimony before the U.S. House of Representatives, Satter stated:

On 14 July 2016, David Satter filed a request to obtain official assessment of who was responsible for the bombings from the State Department, the CIA and the FBI under the Freedom of Information Act. He received response that all documents were classified by US government because "that information had the potential ... to cause serious damage to the relationship with the Russian government". CIA refused even to acknowledge the existence of any relevant records because doing so would reveal "very specific aspects of the Agency's intelligence interest, or lack thereof, in the Russian bombings."

According to a cable on the Ryazan incident from the U.S. embassy in Moscow, on 24 March 2000, cited by Satter, "a former Russian intelligence officer, apparently one of the embassy's principal informants, said that the real story about the Ryazan incident could never be known because it "would destroy the country." The informant said the FSB had "a specially trained team of men" whose mission was "to carry out this type of urban warfare" and Viktor Cherkesov, the FSB's first deputy director and an interrogator of Soviet dissidents was "exactly the right person to order and carry out such actions.".

The latest book by Satter on this subject was The Less You Know, The Better You Sleep: Russia's Road to Terror and Dictatorship under Yeltsin and Putin

Documentary films
A documentary film about the fall of the Soviet Union based on Satter's book Age of Delirium was completed in 2011. Satter also appears in the 2004 documentary Disbelief about the Russian apartment bombings made by director Andrei Nekrasov.

Expulsion from Russia
In December 2013, the Russian government expelled Satter from the country for allegedly committing "multiple gross violations" of Russian migration law; Satter said he followed the procedures the Russian Foreign Ministry set out for him and said that the manner of his expulsion was a formula reserved for spies. Luke Harding suggested that Satter's expulsion from the Russian Federation was part of a wider trend by the FSB that is, "increasingly rejecting visa applications from Western academics seeking to visit Russia if their publications are deemed hostile."

His books
 Age of Delirium: The Decline and Fall of the Soviet Union. Yale University Press, 2001, 
 Darkness at Dawn: The Rise of the Russian Criminal State. Yale University Press, 2003, 
 It Was a Long Time Ago and It Never Happened Anyway: Russia and the Communist Past. Yale University Press, 2007, 
 The Less You Know, The Better You Sleep: Russia's Road to Terror and Dictatorship under Yeltsin and Putin. Yale University Press, 2016, 
 Never Speak to Strangers and Other Writing from Russia and the Soviet Union. Columbia University Press, (2020)

References

External links
 
 Biography at the Hudson Institute site
 
 His articles

1947 births
Living people
Writers from Chicago
University of Chicago alumni
Alumni of Balliol College, Oxford
American Rhodes Scholars
American male journalists
American political writers
People deported from Russia
Russian studies scholars
Hudson Institute
Historians from Illinois